Gerrard Ardeneum in McAlester, Oklahoma, United States, (sometimes called the McAlester Arboretum in confusion with an arboretum of this name in Missouri) was established 1990 as combination of an arboretum and a museum with landscaped gardens and historical artifacts. It is located at 501 North 5th Street.

See also 
 List of botanical gardens and arboretums in Oklahoma

External links
City of McAlester - information under Visitors, Area Attractions
Information
Garrard Ardeneum - YouTube tour in 2003, "Oklahoma Gardening host Steven Owens visits the Garrard Ardeneum in McAlester"

Botanical gardens in Oklahoma
Protected areas of Pittsburg County, Oklahoma
History museums in Oklahoma
Museums in Pittsburg County, Oklahoma
1990 establishments in Oklahoma